The Love Thief is a 1926 silent black and white American romance film. Directed by John McDermott, it stars Norman Kerry, Greta Nissen, and Marc McDermott.

Cast list
 Norman Kerry as Prince Boris Alexander Emanuel Augustus
 Greta Nissen as Princess Flavia Eugenia Marie
 Marc McDermott as Prince Karl
 Cissy Fitzgerald as Countess Leopold Marjenka
 Agostino Borgato as King
 Carrie Daumery as Queen
 Oscar Beregi as Prime minister
 Nigel Barrie as Captain Emanuel Menisurgo
 Vladimir Glutz as Napoleon Alexander Caesar
 Charles Puffy as Prince's guard
 Clarence Thompson as Prince Michael
 Alphonse Martel as Berzoff
 Anton Vaverka as Aide
 Lido Manetti as Captain

References

External links
 
 
 

1926 films
American romance films
1920s romance films
American black-and-white films
American silent feature films
Universal Pictures films
Films directed by John McDermott
1920s American films